Daxam is a fictional planet within the DC Universe. It is home to a race called the Daxamites, who are descended from Kryptonian colonists.

History
In canonical continuity, Daxamites are descendants of a group of Kryptonians who had left Krypton in order to explore the Universe. They are an intensely xenophobic race, and are fearful of alien invaders. Daxam's inhabitants tend to stay on their homeworld, but some have ventured into the galaxy. Daxamites are not vulnerable to Kryptonite because the Eradicator, programmed to preserve all Kryptonian culture, altered the birthing matrix ("artificial wombs") the explorers took with them so that lead is now their new vulnerability. Like their Kryptonian cousins, Daxamites manifest powers and abilities similar to those of Superman when exposed to the light of a yellow star, including vast strength, damage resistance, great speed, flight, enhanced senses and heat and x-ray vision. Their own sun Valor was a red giant, so while on their homeworld, they could not have their powers.  
 
In the post-Infinite Crisis continuity the Daxamites started their life as a more peaceful and less xenophobic offshoot of the Kryptonian race, choosing to gain the trust of the people living on the planets they found rather than mercilessly killing them as the other Kryptonians did. So, when the Kryptonian explorer Dax-Am discovered a planet inhabited by a peaceful native population, the Kryptonians decided to merge with the native Daxamites, giving birth to a race with inherent Kryptonian powers, plus the ability to breed with other humanoid races. This—coupled with the fact that even when they lost track of their Kryptonian origins (choosing to consider themselves only Daxamites), they kept traveling through the stars—allowed for a large mixed-race population residing on the planet, naturally inclined to seek new worlds, while the descendants of the last Kryptonian purebloods kept alive their ideals of isolation and xenophobia.

Eventually, the social unrest stirred by isolationists and explorers exploded in a full-blown civil war. The isolationists won, founding the Cult of Sorrows and rewriting history to blame aliens for the ruins of the war, and hiding the presence of half-breeds on Daxam. By the time of the invasion of Earth, Daxamite society had evolved into a semi-religious regime. Spacefaring for purposes other than conquest was denounced and several pieces of technology were outlawed. Xenophobia had become universal, save for rare exceptions such as Sodam Yat, Kel and Lar Gand, the first and the last of whom were driven to self-imposed exile to avoid harsher punishment for their iconoclasm.

Invasion!

Daxamites took part in an invasion of Earth masterminded by the Dominators. During the invasion, however, the Daxamite forces discovered that they gained tremendous powers—of a set and scale comparable to Kryptonians in a yellow sun environment. While engaging Superman, the superhero convinced his opponents (who were succumbing to lead poisoning) that their allies were wrong to invade Earth and Kel Gand—Lar Gand's father—sent a message before his death to their government to intervene on Earth's behalf. They were successful in this intervention when the Dominators, unaware of the Daxamite's physical reaction to Earth's environment, dismissed the small force of primarily troop transports. Thus they were caught completely off guard when the Daxamites deployed in space an extremely formidable force of hundreds of soldiers who had gained powers and quickly defeated the enemy. They also fought against the galactic destroyer known as Imperiex.

Mongul's Occupancy
Daxam is briefly invaded by the space tyrant Mongul II, and remade into the base of a splinter cell of the Sinestro Corps, the Mongul Corps. Sodam Yat, utilizing the entity Ion, is then forced to sacrifice himself to turn Daxam's sun yellow, granting superpowers to every Daxamite, and, as a result, the ability to repel the invaders. Then a hooded Krona divests Ion from Sodam, freeing the young hero from the sun and restoring it to its red form. The resulting sudden loss of powers decimates the population, as many had been using their powers of flight, superstrength, and invulnerability when the sun changed colors.

The New 52
Daxam was later invaded once again by the Durlans, a shapeshifting race that replaced almost all Daxamites that were on the planet, with the goal to mimic the race and expose themselves to as much yellow sun radiation as possible, thus becoming an unstoppable force.

30th century history

The Great Darkness Saga

In the 1982 Legion of Super-Heroes story The Great Darkness Saga, Darkseid learned of Daxam from Mon-El and proceeded to mind-control its entire populace, and then moved the planet to a yellow sun, creating an army of several billion beings each roughly equal in power to Superman. He then commanded them to sculpt the entire planet's surface in his likeness, effectively destroying Daxam's civilization. This army was then unleashed upon the galaxy as an almost unstoppable force. After the events of The Great Darkness Saga, the planet, returned to its original solar system by an incarnation of Highfather, had to be terraformed in order to restore its habitability, and the Daxamites returned there.

Five years later
In the V4 Legion storyline, Glorith, fearing that the Dominators might gain control of Daxam, destroyed the planet and all its inhabitants to prevent this. Also revealed was the existence of Laurel Gand, another Daxamite and descendant of Lar Gand's brother.

Post-Zero Hour
Following the Zero Hour reboot of Legion continuity, 31st century Daxam is the home to a racist political group called the White Triangle.

Threeboot
Following another reboot of Legion continuity, it was asserted that Daxam was wiped out 300 years earlier by natives of Trom using mass lead poisoning, and that Mon-El is the only surviving Daxamite. However, it was later revealed that this version of Daxam (and the Legion) inhabits the universe which contains Earth-Prime, the home of hero-turned-villain Superboy-Prime. The xenophobic version of Daxam from which Mon-El and Sodam Yat hail is shown as still existing in the 30th century.

Physiology and special abilities

Visually, Daxamites are indistinguishable from humans; this allows Mon-El to lead a double life as Kent. On their native planet, Daxamites do not possess any superpowers as Daxam revolved around the red star Valor. When on planets like Earth which orbit a yellow star, Daxamites utilize solar energy on the cellular level to achieve abilities unattainable by ordinary human beings. Super-powered Daxamites possess the following at the peak of their power: super strength, super speed, invulnerability, a healing factor, heat vision, superhuman senses, flight, super hearing, x-ray vision, telescopic vision, micro-vision, super breath, and ice breath, and any other abilities related to their Kryptonian DNA.

Due to their earlier mating with the native Daxamite population (a race of non-powered people discovered by the Kryptonian explorers) the current population possess the ability to mate with other humanoid races—an ability they do not share with their parent race. The offspring of a modern Daxamite and another humanoid individual, like a terrestrial, would share the full powers and abilities of a full-blooded individual.

All Daxamites are highly vulnerable to lead. Even the smallest exposure instantly robs powered Daxamites of their abilities and results in irreversible, fatal lead poisoning for all. Unlike their Kryptonian cousins where their weakness when exposed to Kryptonite radiation is temporary, lead poisoning in Daxamites is always fatal. In the case of Mon-El, he had to be put into the Phantom Zone after being exposed to lead and spent the next thousand years voluntarily trapped there until an antidote could be found. Different versions of Brainiac 5 have made these antidotes for the different versions of Mon-El, with some being permanent while others were temporary or needed to be administered on a regular basis. One of these antidotes was made using Kryptonite. Like Kryptonians, Daxamites also have no innate invulnerability to magic, and are affected by it as any normal, non-powered humanoid would.

As a result of their interbreeding with the native Daxam race and other non-Kryptonian races, Daxamites exhibit several small physiological differences from their ancestor race; on a planet with a yellow primary sun they grow hair and need to shave, their bodies perceiving hair as "dead".

Daxamites of note

Lar Gand

The galaxy's most famous Daxamite is Lar Gand, known in various incarnations as Mon-El, Valor and M'onel. After the invasion of Earth, it was found that the Dominators had been experimenting on humans and still held a significant number of them captive. Lar Gand helped save the humans the Dominators were experimenting on and took these victims to uninhabited planets, in effect seeding the worlds which would eventually become Legion member worlds. He was later sent to the Phantom Zone for 1,000 years as a protection against dying from lead poisoning. His sudden disappearance troubled many he had helped, and they started a religion around him. He would later be rescued from the Zone by Brainiac 5 and the Legion of Super-Heroes.

Laurel Gand

Laurel Gand is the descendant of Lar Gand. She is a native of Daxam from the 30th century who eventually joins the Legion of Super-Heroes. She is introduced during the "Five Years Later" of Legion continuity, which is no longer considered canonical. Another version of the character appears during the Post-Zero Hour era. She uses the codename "Andromeda" and is a native of Earth-247, which was destroyed during the "Infinite Crisis" storyline.

Ol-Vir

During Darkseid's attempt to conquer the United Planets (UP) in the 30th century, he enthralled the entire population of Daxam, who attacked the UP at his command. Ol-Vir, then a child, nearly destroyed the prison planet Takron-Galtos before being caged by Chameleon Boy. He would later align himself with the Legion of Super-Villains and participate in several attacks on the Legion of Super-Heroes.

Dev-Em

Dev-Em is an insane Daxamite, whose powers as a full-grown adult rivaled Superman's. He tried to destroy the Earth's moon. He is a post-Crisis (pre-Zero Hour) character, who appeared in the limited series Who's Who in the Legion of Super-Heroes #1 (April 1988).

Bal Gand
Bal Gand is an ancestor of Lar Gand, and thus the entire Gand family. A pilot-constable in the spacefaring age of Daxam, she was given the task of finding new planets and establish peaceful relationships with Daxam. After traveling to several inhabited planets in the universe, she landed on Earth in Central America, during the years of the Maya civilization. While the Maya believed that the Daxamite visitors were the gods of their legends (thus starting their renowned practice of human sacrifices in their honor), Bal Gand fell in love with a Mayan soldier, bearing his son. Having broken her role of impartial observer, and out of fear of the disruptions a human-born Daxamite could have brought in the nascent Maya society, she decided to return to Daxam, hiding her ship and programming it with a fast route to Earth to allow her yet-unborn son, if he or his descendants were despised or disallowed from living peacefully on Daxam, to return to Earth to be cared for by the people of their forefather. Bal's son, however, grew to be a well-accepted son of Daxam, his mixed heritage fading in the years to nothing but a legend until Lar Gand, hoping to flee the now oppressive and xenophobic society of Daxam, stumbled into her ship, unwillingly fulfilling his ancestor's promise.

Julia
A female Daxamite befriended Wonder Woman during a six-issue story arc set in space. Both women were prisoners of the Sangtee Empire. Sangtee enforcers ripped out the Daxamite's eyes when she proved to be too difficult to control. Wonder Woman provided her with one cybernetic eye (the other covered with an eye patch) and named the Daxamite Julia in honor of her close friend Julia Kapatelis. Julia later makes a cameo appearance during the company-wide "Our Worlds at War" crossover.

Sodam Yat

According to Alan Moore's Tales of the Green Lantern Corps Annual #2, an ancient prophecy inscribed into the Great Book of Oa marks as the last milestone in the destruction of the Corps the death of a Lantern called Sodam Yat, an unstoppable Daxamite adding the Power Ring's powers to his own. When in fact a rookie Daxamite Lantern called Sodam Yat joins the Corps, Arisia is charged by Salakk to protect him, out of fear the prophecy would come true. During Mongul's invasion, Sodam is forced to remove his ring and dive into Valor, the red sun of Daxam, to turn it into a yellow sun and grant his former people the power to save themselves. As a result, Sodam is trapped in the sun, seemingly immolated. After the Blackest Night, the mysterious mastermind behind the abductions of the emotional spectrum beings manages to reach the self-immolating form of Sodam Yat, kept alive by Ion, and divests the symbiote from his host. As a result, the restored Sodam Yat is sent back to Daxam, while the sudden loss of powers decimates his fellow Daxamites.

In the limited series Final Crisis: Legion of 3 Worlds, it is revealed that, in the future time period of the Legion of Super-Heroes, Sodam Yat is still alive, acting as the last Guardian of the Universe, and has somehow regained the bulk of his Ion powers. He has taken over Mogo's role in searching for worthy candidates for a new iteration of the Corps.

Sodam Yat's first appearance was in Alan Moore's unpublished proposal "Twilight of the Superheroes" where he was named "Sodal Yat".

Telos Usr
Telos Usr of Space Sector 1760 is a resident of Daxam and is inducted into the White Lantern Corps. His power ring, along with the other six, has a portion of the Life Equation to guard it from those who would abuse its power. Should the equation be needed, the rings can come together to restore the full equation.

Other versions
Freedom Fighters from Daxam appear in Justice League Adventures #3.

The Human Defense Corps are keeping a female Daxamite in stasis, for unknown purposes.

The name of the Marvel Comics planet Dakkam (home of Wundarr the Aquarian, who was created as a deliberate Superman pastiche) is based on "Daxam".

In other media

In season 2 of the live-action TV series Supergirl, Daxam was a nearby planet to Krypton that was rendered uninhabitable when Krypton exploded. A survivor, Mon-El, escaped to Earth using a Kryptonian pod. Although it was thought to be destroyed, it was later revealed that the population survived, led by Mon-El's mother Rhea, who brought them to Earth to create "New Daxam" on Earth. Supergirl set off a Lead bomb irradiating the atmosphere with Lead forcing the Daxamites to retreat, after Rhea and some of her Daxamite soldiers were killed.

References

External links
Comic Vine - Wonder Woman In Space

DC Comics aliens
Legion of Super-Heroes
DC Comics dimensions
DC Comics planets

de:DC-Universum#Planeten